The  Vadose Zone Journal is a peer-reviewed scientific journal established in 2002 and published by John Wiley & Sons on behalf of the Soil Science Society of America. It covers research on the vadose zone from across a wide range of disciplines. Since 2018, the journal is published open access.

Abstracting and indexing
The journal is abstracted and indexed in:

According to the Journal Citation Reports, the journal has a 2020 impact factor of 3.289.

References

External links

Earth and atmospheric sciences journals
Publications established in 2002
Continuous journals
English-language journals
Wiley (publisher) academic journals